The 2018 2000 Guineas Stakes was the 210th running of the 2000 Guineas Stakes horse race. It was run over one mile on the Rowley Mile at Newmarket Racecourse on 5 May 2018, a hot and sunny day. The winner was the Japanese bred Saxon Warrior, trained by Aidan O'Brien and ridden by his son Donnacha O'Brien. Tip Two Win was in second place a length and a half behind and the favourite, Masar, was in third place.

Race details
 Sponsor: QIPCO
 Winner's prize money: £283,550
 Going: Good 
 Number of runners: 14
 Winner's time: 1 minute, 36.55 seconds

Full result

* The distances between the horses are shown in lengths. All the runners were three-year-old colts and carried 9 stone.

Reaction
After the race winning jockey Donnacha O'Brien said of Saxon Warrior: "He's a very good horse, he's a proper horse."

Race build-up 
The Aidan O'Brien trained colt Gustav Klimt became an early ante-post favourite for the race after winning the Superlative Stakes at Newmarket in July 2017, but after an impressive win in the Vintage Stakes at Glorious Goodwood, Sir Michael Stoute's Expert Eye then took over as the market leader. Stoute stated it was "too early to tell if he's a Guineas horse" but jockey Andrea Atzeni was more positive, saying, "I don’t think I’ve ever sat on a two-year-old as good as this".

See also
2018 Epsom Derby
2018 British Champions Series

References

2018 in English sport
2000 Guineas
2010s in Suffolk
2000 Guineas
2000 Guineas Stakes